The Chiltonian League was an English football league, existing from 1984 until its merger with the Hellenic League in 2000. While never having a defined place in the English football league system, successful clubs moved from the Chiltonian League to the Combined Counties League and to the South Midlands League.

History

1984-85
The league originally consisted of a single section of 17 clubs, most of which had previously competed in the Wycombe & District League.

1985-95
After its inaugural season, the league expanded to two divisions (for first teams; reserve divisions were constituted separately). The divisions were originally known as Divisions One and Two, but after two seasons this was changed to Premier Division and Division One.

1995-99
In 1995, the reserve divisions were scrapped and the league re-constituted into a single structure of three divisions - Premier Division, Division One and Division Two

1999-00
With only six teams completing the 1998-99 Division Two season, that division was dropped and the league returned to a two-division structure. At the end of the 1999–2000 season, the league merged into an expanded Hellenic League.

 
Defunct football leagues in England
1984 establishments in England
2000 disestablishments in England